Edwin Richfield (11 September 1921 – 2 August 1990) was an English actor.

Career
Richfield starred in the television series Interpol Calling (1959). He was The Odd Man in Granada Television's series of the same name in the early 1960s. Richfield played regular guest roles in the 1960s spy series The Avengers, frequently cast as a villain. He was the only actor – other than Patrick Macnee – to  appear in each of the six seasons of the programme.

Richfield's other television roles include: R3, 199 Park Lane, Gideon's Way, Danger Man, Dixon of Dock Green, Z-Cars, Adam Adamant Lives!, The Baron, Champion House, Out of the Unknown, The Owl Service, UFO, Bergerac, Crossroads, Harriet's Back in Town, Doctor Who (The Sea Devils and The Twin Dilemma), and All Creatures Great and Small.

His film credits include: X the Unknown, Quatermass 2, The Camp on Blood Island, The Face of Fu Manchu and Quatermass and the Pit. He appeared in the Scotland Yard (film series), The Dark Stairway (1953 film) playing Joe Lloyd.

Personal life
While they were both playing in repertory Richfield met the actress Valerie Jeanne Wilkinson (1931–2005), known by her stage name of Jan Holden. They married in 1952, while they were both appearing in a stage version of The Blue Lamp. The couple had three children together: twin girls, one of whom died from a brain tumour, and a boy, Simon. The marriage broke down in 1973.

Selected filmography

 The Jack of Diamonds (1949) – George Paxton
 Ha'penny Breeze (1950) – David King
 Counterspy  ('Undercover Agent', in US) (1953) – Safecracker (uncredited)
 Park Plaza 605 (1953) – Mr. Reynolds
 The Blue Parrot (1953) – Taps Campelli
 Flannelfoot (1953) – Bill Neilson
 Stryker of the Yard (1953)
 Conflict of Wings (1954) – 'Smother' Brooks
 What Every Woman Wants (1954) – Frank
 Radio Cab Murder (1954) – Nat
 The Black Rider (1954) – Geoff Morgan
 Devil's Point (1954) – Daller
 Mask of Dust (1954) – Cynical Reporter in Lounge
 The Brain Machine (1955) – Henry Arthur Ryan, thug
 The Dam Busters (1955) – RAF Officer (uncredited)
 The Blue Peter (1955) – Number One
 Find the Lady (1956) – Max
 X the Unknown (1956) – Soldier Burned on Back
 The Hideout (1956) – 'Teacher'
 Quatermass 2 (1957) – Peterson
 Account Rendered (1957) – Porter
 The Big Chance (1957) – Café Owner
 Black Ice (1957) – White
 The Camp on Blood Island (1958) – Sergeant-Major
 Up the Creek (1958) – Bennett
 The Adventures of Hal 5 (1958) – Cooper
 Further Up the Creek (1958) – Bennett
 Model for Murder (1959) – Costard, Chauffeur
 Make Mine a Million (1959) – Plainclothes Policeman (uncredited)
 No Trees in the Street (1959) – Jackie
 Innocent Meeting (1959) – Bill
 Ben-Hur (1959) – Supplier to Leper Colony (uncredited)
 Tommy the Toreador (1959) – Tommy's dresser
 Inn for Trouble (1960) – Mr. Turner
 Sink the Bismarck! (1960) – Bridge Officer (uncredited)
 Life Is a Circus (1960) – Driver
 The Boy Who Stole a Million (1960) – Commissionaire
 Sword of Sherwood Forest (1960) – The Sheriff's Lieutenant
 Locker Sixty-Nine (1962) – Peters
 Village of Daughters (1962) – Balbino (A Father)
 Just for Fun (1963) – Man With Badge
 The Break (1963) – Moses
 The Comedy Man (1964) – Commercial Director
 The Secret of Blood Island (1964) – O'Reilly
 The Face of Fu Manchu (1965) – Chief Magistrate
 Quatermass and the Pit (1967) – Minister
 UFO (1970) – Admiral Sheringham, "Destruction"

References

External links
 

1921 births
1990 deaths
English male film actors
English male television actors
20th-century English male actors